Amata syntomoides is a moth of the subfamily Arctiinae. It was described by Arthur Gardiner Butler in 1876. It is found in Kashmir and the north-western Himalayas.

References

syntomoides
Moths of Asia